Vegårshei is a municipality in Agder county, Norway. It is located in the traditional district of Sørlandet. The administrative center is the village of Myra. Other villages in Vegårshei include Mo and Ubergsmoen.

The  municipality is the 249th largest by area out of the 356 municipalities in Norway. Vegårshei is the 272nd most populous municipality in Norway with a population of 2,131.

History

The parish of Vegaardsheien was established as a municipality on 1 January 1838 (see formannskapsdistrikt law). The borders of the municipality have not changed since that time.

The population was at its largest in 1930, population 2161.

Name
The Old Norse form of the name may have been . The first element is the genitive case of the name of the lake Vegår (of which the Old Norse form and the meaning of the name is uncertain). Historically, the name was spelled as Wegaardsheien or Vegaardsheien, and sometimes it was abbreviated as simply Heien.

Coat of arms
The coat of arms was granted on 30 April 1987. The official blazon is "Gules a fox sejant argent". This means the arms have a red field (background) and the charge is a fox. The fox has a tincture of argent which means it is colored white most of the time, but if it is made out of metal, then silver is used. The fox was chosen as a representative of the local wildlife and also for the fox farming in the municipality. The arms were designed by Daniel Rike.

Culture

Churches
The Church of Norway has one parish within the municipality of Vegårshei. It is part of the Aust-Nedenes prosti (deanery) in the Diocese of Agder og Telemark.

Geography
Vegårshei is bordered on the north by the municipalities of Nissedal (in Vestfold og Telemark county) and Gjerstad, on the east by Risør, on the south by Tvedestrand, and on the west by Åmli. The lake Vegår dominates the northern part of the hilly and forested municipality.

Government
All municipalities in Norway, including Vegårshei, are responsible for primary education (through 10th grade), outpatient health services, senior citizen services, unemployment and other social services, zoning, economic development, and municipal roads. The municipality is governed by a municipal council of elected representatives, which in turn elect a mayor.  The municipality falls under the Agder District Court and the Agder Court of Appeal.

Municipal council
The municipal council of Vegårshei is made up of 21 representatives that are elected to four year terms. Currently, the party breakdown is as follows:

Economy
As of 2019, public administration and the service sector, are most important in regard to employment; the retail industry and entities that have hotel services and those that serve food and beverages, constitute 11% of employment; agriculture and forestry accounts for 9% of employment; manufacturing accounts for 7% of employment—21% including those employed in construction and those employed in the energy sector and [water supply]vannforsyning/ [garbage collection or] renovasjon. Of the inhabitants that are employed, 55% have employment outside the municipal borders.

It is well-suited for hunting and fishing for residents and tourists alike.

Transportation
The Sørlandsbanen railway line runs through the municipality, stopping at Vegårshei Station, just north of the village of Myra. There are several Norwegian county roads that cross the municipality, connecting it to its neighbors. Some of the roads include Norwegian County Road 414, Norwegian County Road 415, Norwegian County Road 416, and Norwegian County Road 417.

Notable people 
 Lars Vegard (1880 in Vegårshei – 1963) a Norwegian physicist, researcher into aurora borealis 
 Ole Colbjørnsen (1897in Vegårshei – 1973) a Norwegian journalist, economist and politician
 Tjostolv Moland (1981 in Vegårshei – 2013 in Kinshasa) a former Norwegian army officer and security contractor

References

External links
 
 Municipal fact sheet from Statistics Norway 
 

 
Municipalities of Agder
1838 establishments in Norway